Ytres is a commune in the Pas-de-Calais department in the Hauts-de-France region of France.

Geography
Ytres is a farming village located 20 miles (32 km) southeast of Arras, at the junction of the D7, D19 and D18E roads. It was completely rebuilt after being destroyed during World War I. The A2 autoroute passes by on the north of the commune. The Canal du Nord, built between 1911 and 1914, passes by to the south.

Population

Places of interest
 The church of St. Pierre dating from the twentieth century.

See also
Communes of the Pas-de-Calais department

References

Communes of Pas-de-Calais